As a bandleader, the American jazz bassist Charles Mingus released 51 albums between 1949 and 1977; as a sideman, Mingus appeared on a total of 34 albums.
Four albums of his music were released posthumously between 1979 and 1990. Between 1979 and 2015, Sue Mingus produced 19 albums based on his compositions.

Discography as bandleader
List by recording date

Final works as composer

Discography as sideman

Compilations

Mingus Bands

External links
Discogs
Discography at www.jazzdisco.org accessed June 9, 2011
Charles Mingus Homepage accessed June 9, 2011
Discography at Charles Mingus official site accessed January 12, 2020

Discography
Jazz discographies
Discographies of American artists